The Twisted Sisterhood: Unraveling the Dark Legacy of Female Friendships is a non-fiction book by essayist and attorney Kelly Valen published by Random House/Ballantine Books on October 26, 2010.

The book is based on the author's December 2007 article and includes the results of a women's relationships survey the author conducted with 3000 women, studies and insights from experts in the fields of sociology, psychology, and neuroscience, and elements of humor, memoir and popular culture.

References

External links 
 Random House
 Publishers Weekly
 Kelly Valen's official website

Gender studies books
2010 non-fiction books
Ballantine Books books